Robin Hopper  (23 April 1939 – 6 April 2017) was a Canadian ceramist, potter, teacher, author, garden designer and arts activist.

Personal background
He was born in England in 1939, and died April 6, 2017, in Victoria, British Columbia.  He trained in pottery and ceramics at the Croydon College of Art from 1956 to 1961. In 1968 he immigrated to Canada. He spent the first two years teaching at the Toronto Central Technical School. He began his post-secondary educational career in 1970 at Georgian College, Barrie, Ontario where he founded and became head of the Ceramics and Glass Department.  He resigned his post in 1972 to devote his time to his ceramics work. He relocated to Victoria, British Columbia 1977 to operate the family's 'Chosin Pottery Gallery. He was a founding member  and president emeritus of the Metchosin International Summer School of the Arts. Hopper’s work in ceramics includes a great deal of ceramic historical and technical research. Next to ceramics, his other lifelong interest was gardening, particularly the development of his oriental garden.

Body of work
Hopper had both a functional and a decorative side to his production of pottery and ceramic works. His functional works were produced on an artizan basis. His production of functional pottery was by hand craftsmanship for individual pieces of a like design. He wrote several books on the subject of functional pottery. This craftsmanship had a particular application in ceramic works, many of which were one of a kind pieces for artistic exhibition. In these works he used a combination of glazing techniques. These were mainly porcelain decorative plates but he also created specialty items such as glaze paintings. A number of these works reflect the northern imagery of Canada.

Academic and instructional positions
He taught throughout Canada, and in England, The United States, Australia, New Zealand, China, Korea, Japan and Israel.

Selected collections
His ceramic work is in public, corporate and private collections throughout the world. These collections include:
The Bronfman Collection, Montreal, Canada

Awards
Robin Hopper was honoured for his contributions to the arts and public activities.
He was the first recipient of the Saidye Bronfman Award, 1977., Canada’s most prestigious annual award in the crafts. 
Granted honorary member of the National Council on Education for Ceramic Arts.
Member, Royal Canadian Academy of Arts
Member, Order of Canada, 2017

Garden
His interest in artistic gardens led to the creation of the Anglojapanadian Garden at ’Chosin Pottery. This garden at Metchosin, British Columbia has been the subject of publications and television programs.

Bibliography

Publications by Hopper
Robin Hopper wrote several books. Most of them deal with pottery and ceramics.
Making Marks: Discovering the Ceramic Surface Hopper, Robin;  Krause Publications, Paperback: 304 pages, October 1, 2004 
The Ceramic Spectrum 2nd ed. Hopper, Robin; Krause Publications, 2001, 256 pages, 9780873418218
The Ceramic Spectrum 1st ed. Hopper, Robin; Chilton Book Co., 1984, 224 pages 
Functional Pottery 2nd ed. Hopper, Robin; Krause Publications, 2nd Edition 2000, 256 pages, 
Functional Pottery 1st ed. Hopper, Robin; Chilton Book Co., 1986, 257 pages, 
Stayin' Alive Hopper, Robin; Krause Publications, March 15, 2003, 128 pages, 
Clay and Glazes for the Potter 3rd ed. Rhodes, Daniel revised by Hopper, Robin; Krause Publications; 3rd Edition Revised and Expanded, November 15, 2000 
 Focus One: Contemporary Studio Ceramics; Campbell, Kathleen; Hopper, Robin and; Heath, Terrence; Stoneware, raku ware, porcelain, and earthenware by Canadian and international artists, Goose Lane Editions, 112 pages, 1997,

Video productions
Hopper produced videos for the education of potters and ceramists
In 1993 he developed a series of six educational videos on ceramic decoration processes titled “Making Marks”, based on research material for his book of the same title. 
In 1994, he produced a second series of five videos on design and aesthetics was produced, titled “Form and Function”, based on his second book “Functional Pottery”. 
He has subsequently produced:
 “Beginning to Throw on the Potter's Wheel”, 
 “Advanced Throwing”.

See also
List of Canadian artists

References

External links
 National Library of Australia Bibliography

1938 births
2017 deaths
Canadian ceramists
Members of the Royal Canadian Academy of Arts
Members of the Order of Canada